George Anthony Stanich (born November 4, 1928) was an American high jumper who won a bronze medal at 1948 Summer Olympics.  He played college basketball for the UCLA Bruins, where he was a two-time all-conference player in the Pacific Coast Conference (now the Pac-12 Conference).

As a basketball player at the University of California, Los Angeles, Stanich was a guard and led his team to its first NCAA tournament appearance in 50.  He scored 9 points in the East-West All-Star Game and was a first-team all-American (as named by Converse), the first of 24 Bruins who would earn this honor under John Wooden. As a Bruin baseball player, he was a pitcher for 3 seasons, including throwing a 5-hit shutout as a sophomore as UCLA beat USC for the first time in five years. He would become a professional baseball player after graduation, pitching for the Oakland Oaks of the Pacific Coast League, as well as Idaho Falls Russets and Stockton.

On the morning of July 30, 1948, George Stanich, representing the Los Angeles Athletic Club, was one of 26 participants in the high jump trials at the 1948 Olympic Games in London. Twenty men qualified for the finals, and 18 participated in the finals in the rain later that day. Officials from the International Amateur Athletic Federation initially announced that fewer misses would be used to determine the finishing places of the four tied jumpers; the IAAF then announced all four would share second place and the silver medal. Days later they reversed themselves again, and Stanich became the bronze medal winner.

External links
 
 
 Biography at baseball-reference.com

1928 births
Living people
American male high jumpers
American people of Croatian descent
Athletes (track and field) at the 1948 Summer Olympics
Basketball players from Sacramento, California
Junior college men's basketball players in the United States
Medalists at the 1948 Summer Olympics
Olympic bronze medalists for the United States in track and field
Rochester Royals draft picks
Track and field athletes from Sacramento, California
UCLA Bruins men's basketball players
American men's basketball players
Guards (basketball)